Rebecca Lynn Eisenberg is an American technology writer, lawyer, entrepreneur, and columnist who covered the 1995–2001 Internet boom in San Francisco, California and Silicon Valley.

Biography
Eisenberg graduated with a BA in Psychology from Stanford University in 1990 and a JD from Harvard Law School in 1993.

Beginning in 1995 Eisenberg was founder, General Counsel, business development executive, and/or early employee of a number of notable dot-com start-up companies including Cyborganic (the online community founded by hotwired founder Jonathan Steuer), Ecast Network, (which makes a touch screen jukebox used in bars) and PayPal. Having joined as the second lawyer at the company, Eisenberg was the Senior Counsel at PayPal for almost six years. Eisenberg became the General Counsel of Internet Ad Network startup AdBrite, Inc. from March, 2007 through September, 2008, and she served on the board of directors of the Craigslist Foundation (the nonprofit charitable wing of Craigslist) from its inception through late 2007. She was concurrently General Counsel of Pure Digital Technologies, the maker of the handheld Flip Video camcorders, from September 2007 until fall of the following year. While at Pure Digital, she handled the successful merger of the company with Cisco Systems, Inc., for more than $600 million. While providing advisory services to start-ups like The Skinny Scoop, Eisenberg was also the General Counsel of the Sequoia Capital-backed real estate search site Trulia. Eisenberg joined the social news website Reddit in May 2012, where she continues to be the General Counsel. She is active in nonprofits, including serving on the Board of Directors of Legal Momentum, formerly known as the National Organization for Women Legal Defense and Education Fund. She previously contributed to the Silicon Valley Moms Blog, and she continues to handle legal and strategic matters for certain private individuals and companies. She is also a 2020 candidate for the Palo Alto City Council, running on an economic justice and progressive values platform.

Columns, articles, appearances, and blogs
Starting in 1995 Eisenberg wrote one of the earliest blogs called "Read Me." She continued until 2000, at which time she signed off, explaining she had found "a life." The term "blog" had not yet been coined. It was known at the time as an "online diary." In 1999 she was ranked as one of the 25 most important women on the web for her contributions to technology journalism.

Other writings include:
"NouveauGeek" column, MarketWatch, 1998–2001
"NetSkink" column, San Francisco Examiner, 1997–1999
Numerous articles in print, video, and online editions of the San Francisco Chronicle, Upside, Ms. Magazine, ZDTV, Entertainment Weekly, Wired, Fast Company, PBS, the Red Herring, and Bitch
Moderated, lectured, and hosted various technology and business-related events including the Digital Be-In, Geekapalooza, 415Tech, and the Electric Minds conference (sponsored by Howard Rheingold's famous start-up of the same name)

References

External links
www.winwithrebecca.com- Eisenberg's homepage]

1968 births
Living people
California lawyers
Stanford University alumni
Harvard Law School alumni
American women lawyers
American lawyers
21st-century American women